Rincon Creek is a creek that marks the boundary between Santa Barbara and Ventura County, California.

References

Rivers of Santa Barbara County, California
Rivers of Southern California